CTE may refer to:

Arts, entertainment, media 
 Central Television Enterprises, formerly Central Independent Television's international distributor, a predecessor of ITV Studios
 Cross Technological Enterprises, a fictional high-tech firm in the Marvel Comics universe
 CTE World (Corporate Thugz Entertainment), the record label of rapper Young Jeezy

Education
 Career and technical education, programs of study primarily in high school generally intended to prepare students for vocational success (United States)

Medicine 
 Chronic traumatic encephalopathy, a neurological disorder observed in people with repeat brain trauma
Computed tomography enterography, a medical imaging technique

Organizations 
 Churches Together in England, the national ecumenical instrument for churches in England
 , a trade union centre in Ecuador

Science, computing, risk management 
 Coefficient of thermal expansion, in thermal mechanics
 Common table expression, a temporary named result set derived from a simple query in SQL
 Conditional tail expectation, a valuation of risk management and insurance liability

Transportation 
 Central Expressway, Singapore, a major highway
 , a defunct Spanish passenger ocean line also called "The Spanish Line"
 CTE, the IATA code for Cartí Airport in mainland Panama serving the Cartí Islands of the San Blas Islands
 CTE, the ICAO airline designator for Air Tenglong, a defunct airline in China
 CTE3,  Water Aerodrome, in Quebec, Canada
 CTE5,  Airport, a defunct airport in Quebec, Canada

Other 
 Critical Technology Element, assessed during an Analysis of Alternatives, a requirement of military acquisition policy in the United States
 CTE Racing-HVM, former name of auto racing team Racing-HVM